Milica Čubrilo - Filipović is a Serbian politician and diplomat. She served as the Minister of Diaspora from 2007 to 2008. In May 2010, she was appointed Serbian Ambassador to Tunisia, and held the position until November 2013.

Education and career
She was born in Carthage, Tunisia in 1969. She graduated in 1992 at the Law School of Panthéon-Assas University. In 1993, she received her MA degree in Anthropology and Law at the Sorbonne.

In 2007, prior to taking the post of the Ministry of Diaspora, she worked as a coordinator of the world congress of the International Press Institute (IPI), scheduled to take place in Belgrade in June 2008. In 2006, she was a consultant for the USAID Regional Competitiveness Initiative, on the strategy and promotion of tourism in the Balkans. From 2003 to 2006, she was the director of the Tourist Organisation of Serbia (TOS). She was in charge of promoting Serbia as a tourist destination, as well as coordinating 80 tourist local organisations in Serbia. During her term, Serbia was featured in over 300 media worldwide, and promoted in all major tourist fairs. As a result, in three years, the number of foreign visitors went up by 60% and the income from the tourist industry was 7 times higher. In 2005, Lonely Planet voted Serbia one of the ten most interesting destinations in the world. From 2001 to 2003, she worked as a correspondent for Le Figaro, La Croix, Radio France Internationale.
   
From 1996 to 2000, she was active in the field of tourism and organisation of cultural and sports events worldwide. She is fluent in French and English and has a working knowledge of Italian and Spanish.

References

External links 
 Milica Cubrilo - Interview

1969 births
Living people
Government ministers of Serbia
People from Carthage
Ambassadors of Serbia to Tunisia
Serbian women diplomats
Paris 2 Panthéon-Assas University alumni
Women government ministers of Serbia
21st-century Serbian women politicians
21st-century Serbian politicians
Serbian women ambassadors